Farlowella hahni is a species of armored catfish of the family native to Argentina and Paraguay where it occurs in the middle Paraná River basin.  This species grows to a length of  SL.

References
 

hahni
Fish of South America
Fish of Argentina
Fish of Paraguay
Taxa named by Herman Meinken
Fish described in 1937